Cynthia Annabelle Thompson (29 November 1923 – 8 March 2019) was a Jamaican sprinter. She was born in Kingston, Jamaica.

She was one of four female athletes who represented Jamaica at its first Olympic Games, the 1948 Summer Olympics. Following her athletics career, she became a paediatrician and retired in 2000.

References

1923 births
2019 deaths
Sportspeople from Kingston, Jamaica
Jamaican female sprinters
Jamaican paediatricians
Olympic athletes of Jamaica
Athletes (track and field) at the 1948 Summer Olympics
Competitors at the 1946 Central American and Caribbean Games
Competitors at the 1950 Central American and Caribbean Games
Competitors at the 1954 Central American and Caribbean Games
Central American and Caribbean Games gold medalists for Jamaica
Central American and Caribbean Games silver medalists for Jamaica
Central American and Caribbean Games medalists in athletics
Olympic female sprinters
20th-century Jamaican women